Majestic was launched at Sunderland in 1811. In 1812 she became a whaler in the British northern whale fishery, whaling at Davis Strait. She was lost there on 16 July 1819.

Career
Majestic entered Lloyd's Register (LR) in 1812 with Lawrence, master, Lane, owner, changing to Mellish, and trade London, changing to London–Davis Strait.

On 5 April 1816 Lloyd's List (LL) reported that Majestic, Lawson, master, had sprung a leak and had had to put back to Stromness. She was on her way to Davis Strait and was going to have to discharge to effect repairs. Majestic had arrived at Stromness on 22 March and resumed her voyage on 31 March.

On 3 March 1818 at Lerwick during a heavy gale, Majestic, Lawson, master, drove on board Flora, Swaneson, master. Majestic carried away Floras rigging and stove in her side. 

The following data is from Coltish:

Fate
On 8 March 1810 Majestic, Lawson, master, sailed from Gravesend, bound for Davis Strait.

On 16 July 1819 Majestic was crushed by ice and sunk in the Davis Strait. Her crew were rescued. Lloyd's List reported on 24 August 1819 that Ocean, Samuels, Equestria of Hull, Majestic of London, Royal Bounty and Thomas & Ann, both of Leith, and Tey of Dundee, had been lost in Davis Strait. Their crews were saved.

Post script
In 1824 a harpoon from Majestic in 1819 was recovered from a whale. The harpoon had gotten embedded in the near left fin.

Citations and references
Citations

References
 
 

1811 ships
Age of Sail merchant ships of England
Whaling ships
Maritime incidents in 1819